Charles Saxton is the name of:

Charles Saxton (sportsman) (1913–2001), New Zealand rugby and cricket player
Charles T. Saxton (1846–1903), Lieutenant-Governor of New York

Saxton Baronets
Sir Charles Saxton, 1st Baronet (circa 1730–1808)
Sir Charles Saxton, 2nd Baronet (1773–1838), MP for Malmesbury (UK Parliament constituency)

See also
Charlie Saxton, actor